IP3 may refer to:

 Inositol trisphosphate (IP3), used for signal transduction in biological cells
 Third-order intercept point, in radio telecommunication
 IP3 International, a nuclear technology company